Below is the tentative list of UNESCO World Heritage Sites in Turkey. (For the criteria see the selection criteria.)

Tentative List

Geographical distribution

See also 
List of World Heritage Sites in Turkey

References

External links 
Tentative World Heritage Sites in Turkey

Cultural history of Turkey

tr:Türkiye'deki Dünya Mirasları listesi#Geçici Liste